Haploporidae is a family of trematodes in the order Plagiorchiida.

Genera
The genera are organised by their subfamily.
Chalcinotrematinae Overstreet & Curran, 2005
Chalicinotrema Texeira de Freitas, 1947
Paralecithobotrys Teixeira de Freitas, 1948
Intromugil Overstreet & Curran, 2005
Saccocoelioides Szidat, 1954
Forticulcitinae Blasco-Costa, Balbuena, Kostadinova & Olson, 2009
Forticulcita Overstreet, 1982
Xiha Andres, Curran, Fayton, Pulis & Overstreet, 2015
Haploporinae Nicoll, 1914
Dicrogaster Looss, 1902
Elliptobursa Wu, Lü & Zhu, 1996
Haploporus Looss, 1902
Lecithobotrys Looss, 1902
Litosaccus Andres, Pulis, Cribb & Overstreet, 2014
Pseudodicrogaster Blasco-Costa, Montero, Gibson, Balbuena & Aneta Kostadinova, 2009
Pseudolecithobotrys Blasco-Costa, Gibson, Balbuena, Raga & Kostadinova, 2009
Ragaia Blasco-Costa, Montero, Gibson, Balbuena & Aneta Kostadinova, 2009
Saccocoelium Looss, 1902
Unisaccus Martin, 1973
Megasoleninae Manter, 1935
Hapladena Linton, 1910
Megasolena Linton, 1910
Metamegasolena Yamaguti, 1970
Myodera Montgomery, 1957
Vitellibaculum Montgomery, 1957
Waretrematinae Srivastava, 1937
Capitimitta Pulis & Overstreet, 2013
Carassotrema Park, 1938
Conohelmins Fischthal & Nasir, 1974
Culuwiya Overstreet & Curran, 2005
Elonginurus Lü, 1995

Parasaccocoelium Zhukov, 1971
Pholeohedra Cribb, Pichelin & Bray, 1998
Platydidymus Overstreet & Curran, 2005
Pseudohapladena Yamaguti, 1952
Saccocoelioides Szidat, 1954
Skrjabinolecithum Belous, 1954
Spiritestis Nagaty, 1948
Waretrema Srivastava, 1937
Pseudohaploporinae Atopkin et al., 2019

References

 
Trematode families